True Till Death is the first studio album by Boston hardcore punk band Death Before Dishonor. It was released in 2002 on Spook City Records.

Track listing

References

2002 debut albums
Death Before Dishonor (band) albums